Darkhaneh may refer to:
 Darkhaneh, Gilan
 Darkhaneh, Talesh, Gilan Province
 Darkhaneh, Hormozgan